Duke is a masculine given name, also used as a nickname or stage name. Notable people with the name include:
 Duke Aiona (born 1955), American politician
 Duke Cunningham (born 1941), American fighter pilot and politician
 Duke Dawson (born 1996), American football player
 Duke Droese (born 1968), American wrestler
 Duke Dumont (born 1981), English DJ
 Duke Ejiofor (born 1995), American football player
 Duke Ellington (1899-1974), American jazz musician
 Duke Ihenacho (born 1989), American National Football League player
 Duke Kahanamoku (1890–1968), Hawaiian swimmer and surfer
 Duke McKenzie (born 1963), British retired boxer
 Duke Pearson (1932-1980), American jazz musician
 Duke Powell (born 1955), American paramedic and politician
 Duke Riley, American artist
 Duke Riley (American football) (born 1994), American football player
 Duke Snider (1926-2011), American baseball player

Masculine given names
English masculine given names